Ağdacı is a quarter of the city Bartın, Bartın District, Bartın Province, Turkey. Its population is 1,851 (2021). It is very close to Bartın. The name of the village refers to ağda a semi solid sweet syrup, a speciality of the village.

References

Bartın District